Political entities in the 1st century BC – Political entities in the 2nd century – Political entities by year

		
This is a list of political entities that existed between 1 AD and 100 AD.

Political entities

See also
List of Bronze Age states
List of Iron Age states
List of Classical Age states
List of states during Late Antiquity
List of states during the Middle Ages

References

+01
1st century-related lists